Budapest Week was the first independent English-language newspaper in Budapest, Hungary, founded in March 1991. The weekly periodical served the expatriate population and larger English-speaking population in Hungary.

The paper's founders were Rick Bruner, Steve Carlson, Richard W. Bruner, Tibor Szendrei, and Blake Steinberg. Budapest Week was Hungary's first independent English language newspaper after the fall of Communism in Eastern Europe. It was followed by competitors, notably The Budapest Sun and The Budapest Business Journal. There was a newspaper that resembled Budapest Week and its role in the social movement of the expatriate scene there at the time in the popular novel Prague by Arthur Phillips.

Peter Freed backed the paper financially in 1992 and remained its owner until the paper ceased printing around 2000. BudapestWeek.com is an infrequently updated web site affiliated with the newspaper's legacy.

References 

1991 establishments in Hungary
2000 disestablishments in Hungary
Defunct newspapers published in Hungary
Defunct weekly newspapers
English-language press in Hungary
Newspapers published in Budapest
Publications established in 1991
Publications disestablished in 2000
Weekly newspapers published in Hungary